Arif'in Hilesi (Arif's Trick) is an 1874 Turkish-language opera by the Armenian composer Tigran Chukhajian (Dikran Çuhaciyan in Turkish). It is based on Nikolai Gogol's The Government Inspector. Although the first Turkish-language opera is often regarded as the same composer's Leblebici Horhor (Horhor the Chickpea Seller) of 1875, since this latter opera became wildly popular, Arif'in Hilesi is earlier. It was performed in Gedikpaşa Theatre by Çuhaciyan's  Operet Kumpanyası.

References

Sources
 

Compositions by Tigran Chukhajian
1874 operas
Turkish-language operas
Operas